Ramelton, also Rathmelton, is a town and townland in County Donegal, Ireland. , its population was 1,266.

History
Ramelton is situated at the mouth of the River Lennon, 11 km north of Letterkenny and 4 km south of Milford, on the western shores of Lough Swilly. The town is named from Ráth Mealtain, (Irish for "the fort of Mealtan"), an early Gaelic chieftain. The fort is said to lie under the ruins of a medieval castle of the O'Donnells, the ruling family of West Donegal before their exile to mainland Europe in 1607.

Ramelton was settled by English and Scots planters during the Ulster Plantation of the 17th century and is the site of the oldest Presbyterian church in Ireland.

Facilities
Ramelton is serviced by many shops and services within the town. The Town Hall in Ramelton was built in the late 19th century and still has a vital role in the community today.

The town has many grocery stores including Kernan's Spar Supermarket, Whoriskey's Eurospar and McFadden's Supermarket.
 
The town has three main churches: St. Mary's Catholic Church, St. Paul's Church of Ireland (Parish of Tullyaughnish), and the Presbyterian Church.

The town is served by a private bus service which serves Ramelton from Mondays to Saturdays to and from Letterkenny, the largest town in County Donegal. Three buses leave Ramelton for Letterkenny each day Monday to Saturday, with two buses leaving Letterkenny for Ramelton.

Music and Sport
The town is home to a marching band which frequently wins prizes in the Miscellaneous Marching Bands (Buíon Rogha Gléas) category of the All-Ireland Fleadh.

Swilly Rovers Football Club is based in the town. It was founded in 1929. It also has a tennis club.

Other
The town is home to McDaid's soft drinks manufacturer whose drinks are sold throughout Donegal and further afield. Its most famous drink is the Football Special which was originally produced to celebrate the successes of Swilly Rovers Football Club.

The town was the setting for the 1995 television serial The Hanging Gale, which told of the Great Famine of the 19th century.

Ramelton is also a key setting for the A.E.W. Mason novel The Four Feathers.

The town hosts the Lennon Festival, a village fair, since 1970. Ramelton is a Fáilte Ireland designated Heritage Town.

The town is also the setting for Django Sur Lennon gypsy jazz festival which has been held in the town since 2015 and has featured gypsy jazz musicians from Europe and beyond.

Notable people
 Catherine Black, private nurse to King George V
 Robert E. Bonner, American publisher, born Ramelton
 William C. Campbell, scientist, Nobel laureate in Physiology or Medicine in  2015
 Will Carruthers, writer and musician with Spacemen 3, Spiritualized and The Brian Jonestown Massacre
 Patsy Gallacher, association football player with Celtic F.C
 Dave Gallaher, All Blacks rugby captain, author and WW1 soldier
 Roy Greenslade
 Arthur Gwynn, cricket and rugby union player
 Edward Gwynn, scholar of Old Irish and Celtic literature
 John Tudor Gwynn, cricket player
 Lucius Gwynn, cricket and rugby union player
 Robert Gwynn, cricket player
 Conrad Logan, professional footballer
 Francis Makemie, clergyman, the founder of Presbyterianism in the United States
 William McAdoo, American Democratic Party politician
 Basil McCrea, MLA, Leader of NI21 in the Northern Ireland Assembly
 Anne-Marie McDaid, rower and paralympian.
 Walter Patterson, first British Governor of Prince Edward Island

See also
 List of towns and villages in the Republic of Ireland

References

External links

Towns and villages in County Donegal
Rathmelton